Noone is a surname. Notable people with the surname include:

Craig Noone (born 1987), English football midfielder
Eímear Noone, Irish conductor and composer
Jimmie Noone (1895–1944), American jazz clarinetist
Kathleen Noone (born 1945), American soap opera/television actress
Nora Jane Noone (born 1984), Irish film and television actress
Paul Noone (born 1981), English rugby league player
Peter Noone (born 1947), English musician
Val Noone (born 1940), Australian author, social activist, academic, historian

See also
Noone language, a language of Cameroon
No one
Noon